Ərəbşahverdi (also, Arabshakhverdi) is a village and municipality in the Gobustan Rayon of Azerbaijan.  It has a population of 538.

References 

Populated places in Gobustan District